The Adcox Student Prince was a two-seat open-cockpit biplane designed by Basil Smith and built by the students of the US Adcox Aviation Trade School in 1929. It was based on the one-off Adcox Special, and the first example flew on 17 September.

A single example of a Student Prince X was produced in 1931 powered by a 90 hp ACE engine.

As of 2004, a single example remains registered in the United States, which was successively re-engined with 100 hp Kinner K-5, then 110 hp Warner Scarab Junior, Comet 150hp, 150 hp Wright-Hisso A and 220 hp Continental E-225 in 1963.

Specifications (Student Prince)

See also

References
Notes

External links

Student Prince
Biplanes
Single-engined tractor aircraft
1920s United States sport aircraft
Aircraft first flown in 1929